PNU-181731 is a drug which acts as an agonist at serotonin 5-HT2 receptors, with strongest binding affinity for the 5-HT2C subtype at 4.8nM, and weaker 5-HT2A affinity of 18nM. It has anxiolytic effects in animal studies with around one tenth the potency of alprazolam and no significant ataxia or other side effects noted.

See also 
 Lorcaserin
 PNU-22394
 PHA-57378

References 

Serotonin receptor agonists
Diazepines
Tryptamines